The second season of The Great American Baking Show begun December 1, 2016 with a two-hour premiere on ABC. This is the first season to air under its current name, dropping the "holiday" title. Ten amateur bakers competed in an eight-week competition for the title of America's best amateur baker.

Husband and wife duo Nia Vardalos and Ian Gomez returned as hosts, alongside judges Mary Berry and American pastry chef Johnny Iuzzini. This was the final season of Vardalos and Gomez hosting the show as well as Berry's final season as judge.

On January 12, 2017, after eight weeks of competition, Amanda Faber won the season with Stephanie Chen as runner-up. This is the first season in Bake Off history to have two voluntary exits and a final two instead of a final three on finale week. Antoinette Love, who withdrew from the competition tis season, returned for Season 3, where she finished in 4th place.

Bakers

Results summary

Color key:

 Following a family emergency the night before week 2's technical, Antoinette withdrew from the competition.
 There was no elimination this week.
 As the result of an overnight illness, Michael withdrew from the competition.

Episodes

Episode 1: Cake
In their first signature bake, the ten bakers created a winter-themed Bundt cake in under two hours. The cakes required a swirl or filling on the inside, with frosting and lace on the outside. Mary Berry's apple almond cake served as the first technical bake of the season. Lastly, in the showstopper, the bakers had five hours to show off their decorative and structural skills in their multi-tiered holiday celebration cakes.

Color key:

Episode 2: Cookies
Bakers were set the challenge to bake twelve bar cookies of identical size and shape. The technical featured biscotti, a "twice-baked" cookie with delicate chocolate piping according to Johnny Iuzzini's recipe. The night before the showstopper, it was revealed that Antoinette had to leave the competition due to a family emergency. With eight bakers left, the showstopper and elimination continued as they had five hours to create a three-dimensional cookie scene with a holiday twist.

Episode 3: Bread
In the competition's first bread week, bakers had two hours to create twelve savory yeast dinner rolls in under two hours. The technical bake of the week was stollen, a German Christmas fruit and nut bread with rum and a sausage-shaped marzipan in the middle. In the final bake of the week, bakers created another three-dimensional holiday centerpiece for the showstopper bake, this time with different and unique collections of breads. With the judges failing to reach a consensus as to who would go that week, no one was eliminated.

Episode 4: Pies and Tarts
The night before the signature bake, Michael withdrew from the competition due to illness. With six bakers left in the competition, pies and tarts week began with a meringue pie baked and torched under a two-hour frame. The technical bake challenged bakers to create a free form, pear-shaped pear tart with an additional frangipane layer below the pears. For the showstopper challenge, bakers had four hours to make three dozen savory tartlets in two unique crusts and flavors.

Episode 5: Chocolate
Chocolate week began with bakers attempting to create twelve miniature molten lava cakes with an oozing chocolate center within two hours. Johnny Iuzzini's specialization on chocolate increased the pressure among the remaining bakers in the next technical. Bakers had to make twenty-five truffles with two different types of ganache: a hazelnut coffee white chocolate ganache and a banana coconut rum  ganache. The showstopper tested the bakers' mousse skills with two distinct flavors and chocolate decorations as a finishing touch.

Episode 6: Custard and Meringue
The final four bakers began the week by baking 12 crème brûlées with the flavors of their choice in two hours. Next in the technical, bakers tested their skills in Mary Berry's French recipe œufs en neige, or "eggs in snow". The judges looked for six perfectly poached meringues and crèmes anglaise. The quarter-final showstopper required the bakers to bake two dozen pavlovas of two different meringues and fillings within four hours.

Episode 7: Pâtisserie
In the semi-final signature bake, the final three bakers created twenty-four petits fours, or mini cakes delicately covered with fondant and icing. With two more chances left to impress the judges, bakers had to recreate twelve crullers, a fried donut-like choux pastry, in under ninety minutes. For the showstopper, a sharing-size mille-feuille (also known as the Napoleon) tested the final three's precision on making a perfect puff pastry.

Episode 8: Final
Three challenges remain for the final two bakers before a winner is crowned. For the signature bake, the final two had two hours to bake twenty-four handheld savory pastries and tested the bakers' technical detailing in the creation of different doughs and fillings. In the final technical, Mary Berry set the challenge on the bakers to create a British Battenberg cake with a checkerboard pattern and precise amounts of marzipan and jam on the inside and out. The final bake of the season put all of the bakers' skills to the test with a Winter celebration dessert display of cakes, cookies, custards, pastries and additional desserts of their choosing.

Ratings

References 

2
2016 American television seasons
2017 American television seasons